Duncan John Gay (born 2 May 1950), an Australian politician, was the Vice-President of the Executive Council of New South Wales and the Leader of the Government in the Legislative Council from May 2014 to January 2017; and the Minister for Roads, Maritime and Freight from April 2015 to January 2017. Gay was the Leader of the Nationals in the Legislative Council until January 2017 and was a member of the Council from 1988 to 2017, representing The Nationals.

He served as the Minister for Roads and Freight, and as the Minister for the North Coast between 2014 and 2015 in the first Baird government; and the Minister for Roads and Ports in the O'Farrell ministry between 2011 and 2014.

Early life
Gay was born and raised in Crookwell, New South Wales near Goulburn and educated at Crookwell District Rural School. He attended Newington College (1962–1967) in Sydney as a boarding student before studying accountancy and wool classing. He is married to Katie and they have two children.

Prior to his political career, Gay owned a small trucking company and managed his family's grazing property at Crookwell.

Political career
Gay was elected as a member of the New South Wales Legislative Council in March 1988 and has been a member of the National Party since 1974; and served in various portfolios and positions while in Opposition.

Following the election of the O'Farrell government at the 2011 election, Gay was appointed as the Minister for Roads and Ports in the New South Wales government. Following the resignation of Barry O'Farrell as Premier, and the subsequent ministerial reshuffle by Mike Baird, the new Liberal Leader, in April 2014 the name of Gay's portfolio changed to Minister for Roads and Freight; the responsibilities as Vice-President of the Executive Council and Leader of the Government in the Legislative Council were added in May 2014; and as Minister for the North Coast added in October 2014. Following the 2015 state election, Gay's portfolio responsibilities were amended slightly and renamed as Minister for Roads, Maritime and Freight.

Major activities in Gay's term as Minister for Roads included Bridges for the Bush, Fixing Country Roads and Fixing Country Rail as well as commencement of planning for the introduction of the WestConnex; a road project that has had its costs reported to be overrun by A$1.4 billion. Gay announced the preferred construction contractor for the NorthConnex; and the continued duplication of the Pacific Highway.

In January 2017 Gay was replaced in the reshuffle of the Berejiklian ministry. He retired from politics at the end of July and took up a paid advisory role with private transport and infrastructure consultancy MU Group. Gay is a Director of ARC Asia-Pacific Consortium and in September 2018 was appointed Chair of the National Heavy Vehicle Regulator.

References

External links
 Legislative Council of NSW Oral History Project - Interview on 10 December 2018

1950 births
Living people
Members of the New South Wales Legislative Council
National Party of Australia members of the Parliament of New South Wales
People educated at Newington College
21st-century Australian politicians
Chairman of Committees of the New South Wales Legislative Council